Survival is the fifth studio album by the Dutch hardcore punk band Born from Pain. It was released in 2008 on Metal Blade Records.

Track list

References

2008 albums
Born from Pain albums
Metal Blade Records albums